During the 1947-48 season Associazione Calcio Torino competed in Serie A .

Summary
The team set many records throughout the season: top score in the standings, with 65 points in 40 games; the maximum advantage over 2nd place: 16 points over A.C. Milan, Juventus and Triestina; biggest home win, 10–0 against Alessandria; a total of 29 wins out of 40 games; the longest unbeaten run, 21, with 17 wins and 4 draws; the most points at home, having won 19 games out of 20 at Stadio Filadelfia; the highest number of goals scored, 125; and fewest conceded, 33.
The best goalscorers were Mazzola (25 goals) and Gabetto (23), just behind Giampiero Boniperti from Juventus with 27 goals.

Squad 
Source:

 (Captain)

Transfers

Competitions

Serie A

League table

Matches

Friendlies 
After a record campaign, Torino was invited by the Paulista Football League (Federação Paulista de Futebol-FPF),  to play several friendly matches in Sao Paulo, Brazil.

Statistics

Squad statistics

Players statistics 
Source:

Appearances
40.Valerio Bacigalupo
39.Aldo Ballarin
29.Eusebio Castigliano 
15.Josef Fabian 
16.Pietro Ferraris 
36.Guglielmo Gabetto 
33.Giuseppe Grezar 
33.Ezio Loik 
17.Virgilio Maroso 
27.Danilo Martelli 
37.Valentino Mazzola 
38.Romeo Menti
17.Franco Ossola 
39.Mario Rigamonti 
24.Sauro Tomà

Goalscorers
25.Valentino Mazzola 
23.Guglielmo Gabetto 
16.Romeo Menti
16.Ezio Loik
9.Danilo Martelli 
9.Franco Ossola 
9.Josef Fabian 
1.Aldo Ballarin
7.Eusebio Castigliano 
3.Pietro Ferraris 
5.Giuseppe Grezar 
1.Virgilio Maroso

References

External links
 
 

Torino F.C. seasons
Torino
Italian football championship-winning seasons